Government Home Economics College Nowshera is public sector girls college located at Pirpiai in Nowshera, Khyber Pakhtunkhwa, Pakistan.

Overview & history 
Government Home Economics College Nowshera is established in June 2015 by Government of KPK in order to develop Home Economics Education for female students.

Faculties 
The college currently has the following faculties.

 Computer Studies
 Economics
 English
 Islamyiat
 Pakistan Studies
 Psychology
 Science Department
 Statistics
 Urdu
 Art & Design
 Food & Nutrition
 Human Development and Family Studies
 Resource and Facility Management
 Textiles & Clothing

See also  
 Government Post Graduate College Nowshera

External links 
 Government Home Economics College Nowshera Official Website

References 

Public universities and colleges in Khyber Pakhtunkhwa
Universities and colleges in Nowshera District
Educational institutions established in 2015
2015 establishments in Pakistan